Helen Lawrie Liddell, Baroness Liddell of Coatdyke PC ( Reilly; born 6 December 1950) is a British politician and life peer who served as Secretary of State for Scotland from 2001 to 2003 and British High Commissioner to Australia from 2005 to 2009. A member of the Labour Party, she was Member of Parliament (MP) for Airdrie and Shotts, previously Monklands East, from 1994 to 2005.

Early life
Liddell was born to Hugh Reilly, a Catholic, and Bridget Lawrie Reilly, a Protestant. She was educated at St. Patrick's Catholic High School in Coatbridge, attending at the same time as John Reid, and graduated from the University of Strathclyde with a BA in Economics.

Early career
Liddell worked as a BBC Scotland economics journalist from 1976 to 1977. At the age of 26, she served as the first female General Secretary of the Scottish Labour Party from 1977 to 1978. She was subsequently public affairs director of the Daily Record and Sunday Mail, working for media proprietor Robert Maxwell.

Business Interests 
Appointed Director of Annington Limited, 1st April 2017. The British Ministry of Defence, as of November 2022, are trying to regain ownership of the housing stock that was sold off to Annington in 1996. As Chair of Annington, Baroness Liddell defended Annington via a letter to the British Defence Secretary saying she was "shocked" by the Government's approach.

Parliamentary career
She first contested the Parliamentary constituency of East Fife at the October 1974 general election.

House of Commons 
Liddell was first elected to Parliament in 1994, at the closely contested Monklands East by-election following John Smith's death. She was appointed a Privy Councillor on 27 October 1998.

She was Secretary of State for Scotland from 2001 to 2003, a position whose powers had been transferred to the Scottish Executive after devolution in 1999. In addition, she angered the monks of Buckfast Abbey when she called on them to stop selling Buckfast in Scotland. She was dubbed Minister for Monarch of the Glen after several visits to the set of the hit BBC series.

The disclosure that she was able to work French lessons into her ministerial diary, raised questions about the relevance of Scottish Secretary's job post-devolution. The role was abolished as a full-time position in 2003, when the Scotland Office was rolled into the Department for Constitutional Affairs.

She took up appointment as British High Commissioner to Australia in the summer of 2005, and was succeeded in the role by Baroness Amos in October 2009.

House of Lords 
On 28 May 2010, it was announced in the Dissolution Honours List that she would be created a life peer. On 7 July, she took the title Baroness Liddell of Coatdyke, of Airdrie in the County of Lanarkshire, six days later becoming a House of Lords member. She is a member of Labour Friends of Israel. In 2010–11 Liddell was a member of the independent Philips inquiry into the 1994 Scotland RAF Chinook crash on the Mull of Kintyre, established by the Secretary of State for Defence.

Personal life
She married Alistair Liddell in 1972; they have one son and one daughter.<ref>[http://www.debretts.com/people-of-today/profile/6767/Helen-Lawrie-Liddell-LIDDELL-OF-COATDYKE Debrett's People of Today]</ref>

 Publications 

 Liddell, Helen (1990). Elite. Century.

References

Further reading
Torrance, David, The Scottish Secretaries'' (Birlinn 2006)

External links
Debrett's People of Today''
Guardian Politics Ask Aristotle – Helen Liddell
TheyWorkForYou.com – Helen Liddell MP
Satirical website dedicated to Helen Liddell
Appearances on C-SPAN

|-

|-

|-

|-

|-

1950 births
Living people
Alumni of the University of Strathclyde
BBC newsreaders and journalists
British Secretaries of State
Female members of the Parliament of the United Kingdom for Scottish constituencies
High Commissioners of the United Kingdom to Australia
Female members of the Cabinet of the United Kingdom
Labour Party (UK) life peers
Life peeresses created by Elizabeth II
Scottish Labour MPs
Members of the Privy Council of the United Kingdom
Labour Friends of Israel
UK MPs 1992–1997
UK MPs 1997–2001
UK MPs 2001–2005
20th-century Scottish women politicians
20th-century Scottish politicians
21st-century Scottish women politicians
21st-century Scottish politicians
British women ambassadors
British women television journalists
British women radio presenters